Tata Football Academy (Tata FA or TFA) is an association football academy situated in Jamshedpur, Jharkhand, India, sponsored by Tata Steel, which owns ISL outfit Jamshedpur FC. It is one of the renowned football academies in India.

History
Jamsetji Nusserwanji Tata envisaged not only Asia's first fully integrated Steel Plant but also the model township of Jamshedpur. He advised his son, Sir Dorab Tata, to earmark "areas for Football, hockey and Parks... ". Tata Steel's commitment to sports, in fact, preceded the building of the township. The aforesaid letter was written in 1902 and the site for Jamshedpur selected in 1907.

J. R. D. Tata gave fruition to J. N Tata's vision, inculcating sports as an integral part of Tata Steel's corporate philosophy. It is part of this very same commitment that made Tata Steel set up the Tata Steel Sports Foundation, to inculcate among the young men and women of India the sporting spirit, the zeal to excel, to win, and above all the discipline and dedication that brings out the winner in the individual. TFA, conceived in 1983 and inaugurated in 1987, was one intrinsic component of the Tata Ideal manifested in reality. Legendary Indian footballers Chuni Goswami and Arun Ghosh served as director of TFA from 1986 to 1989 and 1997 to 2003 respectively.

In November 2017, it was announced that TFA will tie-up with La Liga giants Atlético Madrid, to enhance and strengthen its existing programmes for promoting Indian football. It was also announced that, TFA is to be renamed as Tata Atletico Football Academia.

In March 2019, Carlos Santamarina was appointed as the head coach of TFA. Santamarina has been involved with Atlético Madrid's youth coaching set up, which includes development and coaching of kids in the age group of U-15, U-14, U-13 and U-12.

Honours

Domestic competitions
National Football League II
Champions (1): 2005–06
 I-League U19
 Champions (2): 2014, 2008
 Runners-up (1): 2013
 IFA Shield
 Champions (1): 2016
 Sikkim Governor's Gold Cup
Champions (1): 2003
 Independence Day Cup
Runners-up (1): 1999
 Bordoloi Trophy
Champions (1): 2000
 All Airlines Gold Cup
Runners-up (1): 1991
 Lal Bahadur Shastri Cup
Champions (1): 2004
 Darjeeling Gold Cup
Champions (1): 2011
 Hot Weather Football Championship
Runners-up (1): 2004

See also
 Jamshedpur FC

Notes

References

Football clubs in Jamshedpur
Tata Group
1987 establishments in Bihar
Works association football clubs in India
Association football clubs established in 1987
Football academies in India